Omorgus radula is a species of hide beetle in the subfamily Omorginae and subgenus Afromorgus.

References

radula
Beetles described in 1843